Jacoba Antonia Maria Joanna (Joba) van den Berg-Jansen (born 21 August 1958) is a Dutch politician from the CDA.

References 

Living people
1958 births
Christian Democratic Appeal politicians
21st-century Dutch politicians
21st-century Dutch women politicians

Members of the House of Representatives (Netherlands)
People from Utrecht (city)
20th-century Dutch women